Francesco Cirio (25 December 1836 – 9 January 1900) was an Italian businessman, and is credited with being one of the first in the world with developing the appertization technique in Italy. Appertization is the method of processing vegetables that leads to them being canned. The term comes from Nicolas Appert, who invented the first process for using heat to sterilize food.

Cirio was born in Nizza Monferrato, then part of the Kingdom of Sardinia, to a poor and illiterate family. When he was 14 years old he came to the capital of the kingdom, Turin. In 1856, Cirio started preserving tomatoes in tin cans in order for them to be exported. He created his own company (later named Cirio), and when he was 20 years old, he started his first factory in Turin. In 1861, he added further plantations and production facilities in Southern Italy. In 1867, Cirio exhibited his products in Paris at the Exposition Universelle, where he received prestigious awards.

The company was transformed in 1885 into Societa Anonima di Esportazione Agricola Francesco Cirio in Turin. This company very soon opened subsidiaries in Milan, Naples, Belgrade, Berlin, Brussels, London, Paris, and Vienna. Cirio also worked to help the agricultural development of Southern Italy.

References

External links
Cirio.it – company website 
Cirio.co.uk: About Us – company website 

1836 births
1900 deaths
People from Nizza Monferrato
19th-century Italian inventors
19th-century Italian businesspeople
People from the Kingdom of Sardinia